Ang Tundo Man May Langit Din ("Even Tondo possess some Heaven") is a 1986 Tagalog-language novel written by Filipino novelist Andres Cristobal Cruz. The 324-page novel was published by the Ateneo de Manila University Press. The novel involves love and romance occurring between individuals that are residing in a poverty-stricken area in Tondo, Manila in the Philippines. The social background of the individuals produces a "dramatizing effect" in presenting the Philippine experience laid out in contemporary context and setting, giving the novel a similarity in style and theme to Philippine national hero Jose Rizal's Noli Me Tangere.

See also
Canal de la Reina

References

Philippine novels
1986 novels
Philippine romance novels
Political novels
Tagalog-language novels
Novels set in Manila